Honor Charlotte Appleton (1879–1951) was a British illustrator of children's books, including The Children's Alice. She had a delicate watercolour style, influenced by Kate Greenaway and others.

Biography
She was born in Brighton, on the south coast of England, on 4 February 1879 and lived in nearby Hove most of her life. She studied art at the Kensington School, Frank Calderon's School of Animal Painting and the Royal Academy of Arts.

Works
Appleton illustrated more than 150 books in the course of her career, starting first with children's stories and later moving to literary classics. They included the fairytales of Charles Perrault and Hans Christian Andersen, William Blake's Songs of Innocence and a retold version of Alice's Adventures in Wonderland, The Children's Alice.

Her watercolours were exhibited at the Royal Academy, and there was a memorial exhibition of her work at the Hove Library in 1952.

References

External links

Honor Appleton at the Victorian Web
Honor Appleton at Pook Press
The picture book The Bad Mrs. Ginger, 1902, written and illustrated by Honor C. Appleton, at the International Children's Digital Library

1879 births
1951 deaths
British illustrators
British women illustrators
British children's book illustrators
20th-century illustrators of fairy tales
Artists from Brighton
People from Hove
Alumni of the Royal College of Art